"Arigato" is the thirty-seventh single by B'z, released on September 1, 2004. This song is one of B'z many number-one singles in Oricon charts. Despite being a Japanese word, Arigato was written in Rōmaji rather than in Kanji. As B-sides, the single features "Mou Hanasanai" and "Kagayaku Unmei wa Sonoteno Naka ni", an outtake from the album Green.

Track listing 
Arigato

Certifications

References 
B'z performance at Oricon

External links 
B'z official website

2004 singles
B'z songs
Oricon Weekly number-one singles
Songs written by Tak Matsumoto
Songs written by Koshi Inaba
2004 songs